Roy Barker may refer to:

 Roy Barker (American football) (born 1969), American football player
 Roy Barker (priest), dean of Grahamstown
 Roy Barker (cricketer) (1947–2020), English cricketer